The Nicosia derby (or the derby of the eternal enemies) refers to Nicosia's local derby, football matches played between APOEL and Omonia. It is the classic, biggest rivalry in Cypriot football, as the two teams are the most successful and most popular football clubs of the island. The rivalry is also indicative of social, cultural and political differences.

In recent years, APOEL's successes in European Competitions, combined with Omonia's financial struggles, have led to APOEL mostly dominating the rivalry. A seven-and-a-half year long winless streak for Omonia came to an end on 7 December 2020.

Background
The derby originates from 1948 when the board of APOEL FC sent a telegram to the Hellenic Association of Amateur Athletics (Greek: Σ.Ε.Γ.Α.Σ.), with the opportunity of the annual Panhellenic Track and Field Competition stating its wish for the "communist mutiny" to be ended. Club's players considering this action as a political comment on the Greek Civil War distanced themselves or were expelled from APOEL. A month later these players formed AC Omonia. The first derby was played on 12 December 1953 and ended in a goalless draw.

Records and statistics
Last update: 10 March 2021

Summary

Statistics by competition

The table below shows the results of the two teams in the Cypriot First Division.

1In 2008-09, the two teams faced four times but their last match was interrupted due to riots. The Cyprus Football Association judiciary has set aside both groups. This match is not counted in the statistics of the matches of the two teams.

See also
Sports Rivalry
Local derby
List of association football rivalries in Europe

References

Football in Cyprus
AC Omonia
APOEL Nicosia
Football derbies in Cyprus